Bennie Junior Tuinstra (born 12 September 2000) is a Dutch professional volleyball player. He is a member of the Netherlands national team. At the professional club level, he plays for Ziraat Bankası Ankara.

Honours
 National championships
 2019/2020  Dutch Cup, with Lycurgus Groningen
 2020/2021  Dutch SuperCup, with Lycurgus Groningen
 2020/2021  Dutch Cup, with Lycurgus Groningen
 2021/2022  Turkish SuperCup, with Ziraat Bankası Ankara
 2021/2022  Turkish Championship, with Ziraat Bankası Ankara
 2022/2023  Turkish SuperCup, with Ziraat Bankası Ankara

Individual awards
 2018: CEV U20 European Championship – Best Outside Spiker

References

External links
 
 Player profile at Volleybox.net

2000 births
Living people
People from Sneek
Sportspeople from Friesland
Dutch men's volleyball players
Dutch expatriate sportspeople in France
Expatriate volleyball players in France
Dutch expatriate sportspeople in Turkey
Expatriate volleyball players in Turkey
Ziraat Bankası volleyball players
Outside hitters